Morris Cohen may refer to:

 Morris Cohen (chemist), Canadian chemist and corrosion researcher; winner of the 1983 Olin Palladium Award
 Morris Cohen (scientist) (1911–2005), American metallurgist
 Morris Cohen (spy) (1910–1995), American convicted of espionage for the Soviet Union
 Morris L. Cohen (1927–2010), American attorney, law librarian and professor of law
 Morris Raphael Cohen (1880–1947), American philosopher, lawyer and legal scholar
 Morris U. Cohen (1910?–1989?), American teacher accused of Communism
 Two-Gun Cohen (Morris Abraham Cohen; 1887–1970), British-Canadian adventurer and Chinese general

See also
 Maurice Abraham Cohen (1851–1923), linguist and pioneer of Jewish education
 Maurice Alfred Cohen (1905–1968), birth name of composer Michael Carr
 Maurice Cohen (1927–2006), cryptographer for Mossad